Nikola Stošić (born 29 January 2000) is a Serbian professional footballer who plays as a midfielder for Austrian Bundesliga club SV Ried.

References

External links 

2000 births 
Living people
Footballers from Salzburg
Serbian footballers
Serbia youth international footballers
Austrian footballers
Austrian people of Serbian descent
2. Liga (Austria) players
FC Red Bull Salzburg players
FC Liefering players
SV Ried players
Association football midfielders